The King of Kings is an unlicensed NES video game published in 1991 by Wisdom Tree, the creators of Bible Adventures.

Gameplay
Gameplay was split into three games, each illustrating a Bible story relating to the early years of Jesus. In all the games the health points are measured by scrolls, and more scrolls can be earned by answering trivia questions about the King James Version of the Bible. After a game is chosen at the main screen, the player has the choice between two game difficulties (Normal and Easy) and whether the Music is on or off.

Game 1: The Wise Men
In this game, the player takes the vantage point of one after another of the three Biblical Magi who travel to baby Jesus on the first Christmas collecting their specific gifts (frankincense, myrrh, and gold) along with scrolls, that initiate a question each related to the King James Version of the Bible. The background music consists of the carol "We Three Kings".

The game itself is a side-scroller in which the player controls a camel on which one of the Wise Men are riding. He must get to the end of every level while defeating enemies that are encountered with an attack which the camel appears to spit some projectile that destroys all enemies in one hit.

Game 2: Flight to Egypt
In this game, the player takes the vantage point of Joseph, Mary, and baby Jesus traveling to Egypt for safety from King Herod. The background music consists of the carol "Go Tell It on the Mountain".

The game controls and feel are very similar to "The Wise Men", but instead of a camel, the player controls a donkey, and the attack is a kick from the donkey. The course spirals up and is completed once the player reaches the top.

Game 3: Jesus and the Temple
This game alludes to the story which Jesus is left behind at the Temple in Jerusalem at the age of 12. The player takes the vantage point of Joseph, who is traveling to Jerusalem to find Jesus. The background music consists of the carol "What Child Is This?", a.k.a. "Greensleeves".

The character is controlled in a side-scrolling manner, though in this game the player has more control over how high and low he can travel. The player controls Joseph instead of an animal this time, and the level is completed when Joseph reaches the right-most side of the course.

See also
Christian video games

References

External links
Sunday Funday at GamePraise
King of Kings at MobyGames
 Wisdom Tree Games

Christian video games
Christmas video games
Nintendo Entertainment System games
1991 video games
Unauthorized video games
Wisdom Tree games
North America-exclusive video games
Nintendo Entertainment System-only games
Video games about children
Video games developed in the United States
Video games set in the Middle East
Video games set in Egypt
Video games set in Jerusalem
Video games based on the Bible
Works based on the New Testament
Single-player video games